The Beaverton School District is a school district in and around Beaverton, Oregon, United States. It serves students throughout Beaverton, Hillsboro, Aloha, and unincorporated neighborhoods of Portland, OR. The Beaverton Elementary School District 48 was established in 1876, with other elementary districts later merged into the district. The elementary district was later merged with the high school district (10J) to create a unified school district. It is the third-largest school district in the state, with an enrollment of 39,180 students as of 2022. For the 2021–2022 school year the district had a total budget of $622.8 million.

The district employs over 2,100 teachers at its 34 elementary, nine middle, and six high schools as well as several options schools. Mountainside High School, the district's sixth high school, opened in 2017. Tumwater Middle School (previously Timberland), the district's ninth middle school, opened in the fall of 2021.

History
District 48 was established in 1876 as the "Beaverton Elementary School District", serving grades 1–8. Over the years it merged with other elementary districts and finally, in July 1960, merged with the Beaverton High School District to create one unified school district. The district has followed the trends throughout the US, establishing schools for 7th–9th grades in the mid-1960s (to make a 6-3-3 system) and then in 1994 moving 6th grade into middle school and 9th grade back into high school to form the current 5-3-4 configuration.

The Beaverton School District's school-age population grew by 44% in the 1990s, but by only 14% in the 2000s. The median age in the district increased from 33.3 in 2000 to 35.3 in 2010. The total population of the area under the district's jurisdiction was 253,198 as of the 2010 census.

From March 2020 - March 2021, all students were instructed remotely either through online learning or through comprehensive distance learning. Return to in-person instruction is scheduled to be begin in April, 2021 with a hybrid model. About half of the district's students chose in-person hybrid instruction with the rest choosing to continue comprehensive distance learning

Schools

Elementary schools

Middle schools
The Beaverton School District operates nine middle schools housing 6th, 7th, and 8th grades. Prior to the 1994–95 school year they housed students in grades 7–9, as a part of the districts 6-3-3 plan established in the 1960s.

Cedar Park

Cedar Park, located on Park Way, was built in 1965 as the district's fourth middle school. It was first opened during the 1965–66 school year for seventh graders only, with an enrollment of 343; however, construction was not complete until 1966. It opened for all grades beginning with the 1966 school year. The school's mascot is the Timberwolf, and its current principal is Dr. Shannon Anderson. Enrollment for the 2014 school year was 1,043, up from 968 the previous year. Its enrollment in 2018-19 was 1,001. The school received air conditioning for the whole building over the summer of 2017, and its lockers were painted and its fence was replaced over the summer of 2018. This school offers electives such as Drama (also called Theater), Band, Choir, Physical Education, and Spanish. It used to offer a more advanced Spanish class for native speakers as well as a class called Design, which was removed starting in the 2017–18 school year. Cedar Park hosts Rachel Carson Environmental Middle School, which focuses on environmental science.

Conestoga
Conestoga is located on Conestoga Drive. Its mascot is the Cougar, and its principal is Zan Hess. Its 2018-19 enrollment was 997, up from 904 in 2013.

Five Oaks
Five Oaks' mascot is the Falcon, and its principal is Kelly Laverne. 2018-19 enrollment was 1,001, down from 1,055 in 2013.

Highland Park

Highland Park was opened in 1965 to 1,106 students, after several failed bonds in the previous years. Its mascot is the Raider, and its principal is Curtis Semana. 2018-19 enrollment was 855, up from 820 in 2013.

Meadow Park
Meadow Park's mascot is the Eagle, and its principal is Jared Freeman. 2018-19 enrollment was 806, up from 768 in 2013. The building consists of three main halls and two corridors. Facilities also include three gyms, namely the main gym, upper gym, and west gym.

Mountain View
Mountain View's mascot is the Mountaineer, and its principal is Wendy Rider. 2018-19 enrollment was 895, up from 856 in 2013.

Stoller

Stoller is located on Laidlaw Road. Its mascot is the Jaguar, and principal is Veronica Galvan. 2018-19 enrollment was 1,554, up from 1,341 in 2013. It is the largest middle school in the school district, and in the state of Oregon.

On November 30, 2018, a threat of violence was made, prompting law enforcement and increased police in the school. The threat was heavily rumored to be a bot that sent out similar threats across the country on the same day. Many other threats were also made in the 2018–19 school year causing panic in many cases.
 Several threats since then have prompted tighter security measures around the school.

Tumwater
Tumwater is district's newest middle school is located on NW 118th, and the principal is Jill O'Neill. Tumwater means 'waterfall' in the Chinook Wawa language and opened in the fall of 2021.

FLEX
This is the district's online school, the principal is Paul Ottum.

Whitford

Whitford is located in Garden Home–Whitford. Garden Home was an established community when the Oregon Electric Railway was built at the beginning of the 20th century, which named a depot on the line for the community. Whitford was a station on the same line, located at the present-day intersection of Allen Road and Scholls Ferry Road (Oregon Route 210); the name was created by combining the names of W. A. White and A.C. Bedford, New York investors who were directors of the railway. Whitford Station closed when the railway stopped running around 1920, but the name stuck. The school itself opened in 1963 to grades 7 and 8. Whitford also offers the summa program for those who score highly on specific tests. Whitford's mascot is the Coachman, and its principal is Zan Hess. 2014 enrollment was 681, up from 680 in 2013.

High schools
High schools in Beaverton are part of the Metro League for interscholastic athletics and activities.  The newest, Mountainside High School, opened in September 2017 for freshmen and sophomores. As a result, the district began planning to alter its high school boundaries. The boundary changes were approved in June 2017 and went into effect at the beginning of the 2017–2018 school year.

Option schools

 Arts & Communication Magnet Academy (ACMA)
 Focuses on the arts for 6th through 12th grade students. Principal: Bjorn Paige.
 Beaverton Academy of Science and Engineering (BASE)
 A merger of the former schools Beaverton Health & Science School and School of Science and Technology. Principal: Andrew Cronk.
 International School of Beaverton (ISB)
 Offers the International Baccalaureate program for 6th through 12th grade students. Principal: Andrew Gillford.
 Community School
 Community School. Principal: Rachel Sip.
 Rachel Carson Environmental Middle School
 Located at Cedar Park Middle School, it focuses on environmental science for 6th through 8th grade students. Principal: Shirley Brock.
 Summa
 Programs at Meadow Park, Whitford, Stoller and Tumwater middle schools for talented and gifted students. 795 students were enrolled in Summa classes at five middle schools for the 2014–2015 school year.
In November 2014 a plan to move Summa students who attend Stoller Middle School to the newly constructed Timberland middle school as a solution to overcrowding was proposed, but was delayed in November 2015 due to opposition from parents and school administration.

Closed schools

Cedar Hills Elementary School
Built in the early 1950s; closed in 1983.  The building was repurposed as the Cedar Hills Recreation Center of the Tualatin Hills Park & Recreation District (THPRD), initially leased from BSD, but sold to THPRD circa late 1986.
Garden Home Elementary School
Closed in 1982 and leased to THPRD, who put it to use as the Garden Home Community Center starting later the same year. The building was later sold to THPRD.
Merle Davies Elementary School (named Beaverton Grade School until 1949)
Opened in 1938; closed in 1983. The building became an annex to Beaverton High School, located directly adjacent, and remains in use as such.
 Sunset Valley Elementary School
 Opened in 1948, and closed in 1980.  The building and property were purchased in 1979 by Electro Scientific Industries, which used it until the mid-1990s. The building was then razed and replaced by a Home Depot store.
C. E. Mason Elementary School
The building is now used as Arts & Communication Magnet Academy.

Administration

School board
According to the Beaverton School District's website, the school board is "responsible for providing an education program for students living within the District boundaries." The board members for the 2022–2023 school year are Susan Greenberg, Sunita Garg, Eric Simpson, Vice Chair Karen Pérez, Ugonna Enyinnaya, Becky Tymchuk and Chair Tom Colett.

Superintendent
The current Beaverton School District superintendent is Dr. Gustavo Balderas, who has served since July 1, 2022.

Demographics

In the 2009 school year, the district had 1114 students classified as homeless by the state's Department of Education, or 3.0% of students in the district. By 2010, the number of homeless students had grown to 1,580, the highest of any school district in the state.

Teacher/student ratios
The following are the district's teacher/student staffing ratios (K-5 numbers have been updated for the 2019–2020 school year):
 Kindergarten - 1:26.95
 Grades 1–5 - 1:30.48
 Grades 6–8 - 1:35.50
 Grades 9–12 - 1:26.4

Student/staff profiles
All information below is as of October 1, 2014.
 Ethnicity:
 13% Asian
 3% Black
 24% Hispanic or Latino
 1% Native American/Alaska Native
 1% Native Hawaiian/Pacific Islander
 52% White
 7% Other (includes students identifying with more than one of the categories above or students not identifying with any of the categories above)
 Number of primary languages spoken in students' homes: 94
 Percentage of students qualifying for free and reduced lunch: 36.6%
 Percentage of students qualifying for special education services: 12.1%
 Percentage of Talented and Gifted students: 13.5%
 Percentage of ESL students: 13.3%
 Percentage of male students: 51%
 Percentage of female students: 49%
 High school dropout rate: 2.7% as of 2013–14, lower than Oregon's average of 3.9%
 Graduation rate: 79.7%, higher than Oregon's average of 72%
 Number of staff:
 Teachers: 2,330
 Classified employees: 1,710
 School administration: 92
 District administration: 30
 Total number: 4,162
 Teachers with a master's degree or higher: 87%
 Average years teaching experience: 14.6
 Salary range: $39,100 - $80,253

See also
 List of school districts in Oregon

References

External links

 

 
1876 establishments in Oregon
Education in Beaverton, Oregon
Education in Hillsboro, Oregon
Education in Portland, Oregon
Education in Washington County, Oregon
School districts in Oregon
School districts established in 1876